The Purple Lily is a lost 1918 silent film drama directed by Fred Kelsey and starring Kitty Gordon. It was produced and distributed by World Film Company.

Cast
Kitty Gordon - Marie Burguet
Frank Mayo - James Caldwell
Muriel Ostriche - Ruth Caldwell
Charles Wellesley - Sir Philip Bradley
Clay Clement - Frank Farnsworth
Henry West - Jean
Howard Kyle - The Curé
John Dudley - The Doctor
Carl Axzelle - Emile

References

External links
 The Purple Lily of IMDb.com

1918 films
Lost American films
American silent feature films
American black-and-white films
Silent American drama films
1918 drama films
World Film Company films
1918 lost films
Lost drama films
1910s American films